At the 1988 Summer Olympics in Seoul, twelve events in sprint canoe racing were contested.  The program was unchanged from the previous Games in 1984.

Medal table

Medal summary

Men's events

Women's events

References
1988 Summer Olympics official report Volume 2, Part 2. pp. 336–50. 
 

 
1988 Summer Olympics events
1988